Samory Toure ( – June 2, 1900), also known as Samori Toure, Samory Touré, or Almamy Samore Lafiya Toure, was a Muslim cleric, a military strategist,  and the founder and leader of the Wassoulou Empire, an Islamic empire that was in present-day north and south-eastern Guinea and included part of north-eastern Sierra Leone, part of Mali, part of northern Côte d'Ivoire and part of southern Burkina Faso. Samori Ture was a deeply religious Muslim of the Maliki jurisprudence of Sunni Islam.

Toure resisted French colonial rule in West Africa from 1882 until his capture in 1898. Samori Toure was the great-grandfather of Guinea's first president, Ahmed Sékou Touré.

Early life and career
Samori Ture was Mandinka, born in c. 1830 in Manyambaladugu (in the Kankan region). Kankan is the second capital city located in eastern part of Guinea West, the son of Dyula traders. He grew up as West Africa was being transformed through growing contacts and trade with the Europeans in commodities, artisan goods and products. European trade made some African trading states rich. The trade in firearms changed traditional West African patterns of warfare and heightened the severity of conflicts, increasing the number of fatalities. Early in his life, Ture converted to Islam.

In 1848, Samori's mother was captured in the course of war by Séré-Burlay, of the Cissé clan. He then went to exchange himself for his mother as a result of his love for her. After arranging his mother's freedom, Samori entered into service to the Cissé, and learned to handle firearms. According to tradition, he remained "seven years, seven months, seven days" before fleeing with his mother.

He joined the Bérété army, the enemies of the Cissé, for two years before rejoining his people, the Kamara. Named Kélétigui (war commander) at Dyala in 1861, Ture took an oath to protect his people against both the Bérété and the Cissé. He created a professional army and placed close relations, notably his brothers and his childhood friends, in positions of command.

Expansion

Battle of Saman-saman
The time that Touré was building his kingdom there were two great kingdoms in southern Mande, Jamoro aji Diakité (Wassoulou) and Worokodo Famoudou whom joined in an alliance to fight against the newly formed theocratic kingdom (Samory) in their area. The two belligerents joined in a battlefield at the evening and the battle would be held in the morning. Samory was tactical master, he did all he could to encounter and negotiate the war with Aji this knight and told him: «I see you are wrong doing this war against your brother Muslim, because you are Fula and Fula peoples are Muslim, and I am Turay and Clans Touré are Manden-Mori (Muslim of Mande), and one Muslim can't fight against his brother Muslim…., And I brought you few cola (the lots of gold) for you to stop this war». 

Jamoro Aji (Diamörö Adji) said « Brother, I understood your message and accepted. You must inform your armies to not shoot my soldiers because I wouldn't use any bullets during the battle. The war took place at 9 AM to 2 PM and Famoudou was defeated and arrested. Samory returned home with his victory and Aji with his gold.

After the war, this news were spread all across Mande: that Touré defeated two great kings in one battlefield and he is absolutely the Keletigui, and the battle was named as «saman-saman» (the pulled-pulled) or the kings were pulling the rules. 

This war helped Touré to become the most influential, most powerful, most social and most known across Mande and neighboring kingdoms.

Theocratic Alliance with Bate 
After Touré's victory in the battle of saman-saman, the theocratic state, Bate, sent commissioners to Touré in Bissandou, to sign-up a protectorate and alliance with him and incite him to fight against the unfaithful states around Bate. Touré accepted and requested their prayers and contributed a few soldiers. 

Samory started with conquering Toron (Törön), the widest kingdom where Bissandou is in the middle, he arrested Nantenen-Famoudou Kourouma (his mother was Nantenen). They crossed the river and started to conquered many little tribal states in the west bank of Milo's river, by annexing Kuru Laminin and Sankaran, he arrested «Murujan» in Kumban Kudanen (New Koumban). He conquered Gbérédou and arrested the Jadaba Conde (probably Alpha Condé's ancestor) in Baro, and then crossed the Gnadan and Niger rivers and conquered Hamana and arrested Manssa Karinkan Keita in Kouroussa. They continued ahead and annexed Balia whose capital was Saraya: he then returned and went in the eastern direction and spent the night near the fortress city of Norassoba, the capital city of Kolonkalan. 

He gave the war commands to Mamadi Kaba (commonly known as Dayi Kaba), and he fled that same night because he thought that Touré wanted to kill him during the war. 

The war began at seven or eight AM and the city was surrounded at 10 AM, and the king (Manssa) Karonkan Doubouya was arrested and Touré asked him saying : I was informed that you were the person who killed the son of El Hadj Oumarou Tall, Seydou Tall, in this city, is this true? Karonkan said no! Not I did it but God; .. after a long discussion, Samori demanded him to bring his members (head, legs and hands), they brought them and Touré sent them to Dinguiraye for the funeral services. 

After the battle of Norasoba, they continued their way to the capital of Joma (Dioma), Diolibakodo, but one of his griots was from there, he demanded Faama to allow him to communicate with his community to avoid the blood effusion, after his dialogues with them, they accepted the peace treaty. 

After the treaty of Diolibakodo and annexation of Fodekareah (Balimana), they crossed the Milo's river and started conquering the eastern river area. He conquered Sakodu and arrested Mansa Soloba Moro (Sölöba-mörö). They then continued their way to annex Kunadou, Dièmèren and Kora-ni-ouélété and then entered the capital of Bate, Kankan, the final treaty was signed under a tree named (Moniuma-yiri): «in case Samory got something that he's confused about, Bate would help him and he too would protect them from all their enemies». 

In 1864, El Hadj Umar Tall died; he had founded the Toucouleur Empire that dominated the Upper Niger River. As the Toucouleur state lost its grip on power, generals and local rulers vied to create states of their own.

By 1867, Ture was a full-fledged war commander, with an army based at Sanankoro in the Guinea Highlands, on the Upper Milo, a Niger River tributary. Ture had two major goals: to create an efficient, loyal fighting force equipped with modern firearms, and to build a stable state.

By 1876, Samori was importing breech-loading rifles via the port of Freetown in the British colony of Sierra Leone. He conquered the Buré gold-mining district (now on the border between Mali and Guinea) to bolster his financial situation. By 1878 he was strong enough to proclaim himself Faama (military leader) of his Wassoulou Empire. He made Bissandugu his capital and began political and commercial exchanges with the neighbouring Toucouleur.

In 1881, after numerous struggles, Ture secured control of the key Dyula trading centre of Kankan, on the upper Milo River. Kankan was a centre for the trade in kola nuts, and was well sited to dominate the trade routes in all directions. By 1881, the Wassoulou Empire extended through the territory of present-day Guinea and Mali, from what is now Sierra Leone to northern Côte d'Ivoire.

Ture conquered the numerous small tribal states around him and worked to secure his diplomatic position. He opened regular contacts with the British colonial administration in Sierra Leone. He also built a working relationship with the Fulbe (Fula) Imamate of Futa Jallon.

First battles with the French
The French began to expand in West Africa in the late 1870s, pushing eastward from Senegal to reach the upper reaches of the Nile in what is now Sudan. They sought to drive south-east to link up with their bases in Côte d'Ivoire. These actions put them directly into conflict with Ture.

In February 1882, a French expedition attacked one of Ture's armies that was besieging Keniera. Ture drove off the French, but he was alarmed at the discipline and firepower which their troops commanded.

He approached dealing with the French in several ways. First, he expanded south-westward to secure a line of communication with Liberia. In January 1885 he sent an embassy to Freetown, offering to put his kingdom under British protection. The British did not want to confront the French at this time, but they allowed Ture to buy large numbers of modern repeating rifles.

When an 1885 French expedition under Col. A. V. A. Combes attempted to seize the Buré gold fields, Ture counter-attacked. Dividing his army into three mobile columns, he worked his way around the French lines of communication and forced them to withdraw quickly.

War and defeat

Samori's army was well equipped with modern firearms and a complex structure of permanent units.  His army was divided into an infantry wing of sofa (Mandinka for infantry, usually slaves) and a cavalry wing. By 1887, Samori could field 30,000 to 35,000 infantry and about 3,000 cavalry, in regular squadrons of 50 each. But, the French did not want to give him time to consolidate his position. 

In March 1891, a French force under Colonel Louis Archinard launched a direct attack on Kankan. Knowing his fortifications could not stop French artillery, Ture began a war of manoeuvre. Despite victories against isolated French columns (for example at Dabadugu in September 1891), Ture failed to push the French from the core of his kingdom. In June 1892, Archinard's replacement, Colonel Humbert, leading a small, well-supplied force of picked men, captured Ture's capital of Bissandugu.

In another blow, the British had stopped selling breechloading guns to Ture in accordance with the Brussels Conference Act of 1890.

Ture shifted his base of operations eastward, toward the Bandama and Comoe River in Dabakala after residing in the Kabadougou Kingdom and obtaining extra forces commanded by the faama. He instituted a scorched earth policy, devastating each area before he evacuated it. Though this manoeuvre cut Ture off from Sierra Leone and Liberia, his last sources of modern weapons, it also delayed French pursuit. After the spring of 1893, the French partially succeeded in cutting off Ture's sources of weapons which was supplied by British traders since the late 1880s. Ture tried to negotiate with the British authorities in the Gold Coast to work together against the French, but the British refused to intervene directly against France.

He then tried to build an anti-European alliance with the Ashanti Empire, but this attempt failed when the Ashanti Empire was defeated by the British; several skirmishes between Ture's forces and the Southern Nigeria Regiment occurred in 1897. The fall of other African armies, particularly Babemba Traoré at Sikasso, permitted French colonial forces to launch a concentrated assault against Ture. By 1898, he lost almost all of his territory and fled into the mountains of western Ivory Coast. He was captured on 29 September 1898 by the French captain Henri Gouraud and was exiled to Gabon despite his request to return to southern Guinea.

Ture died in captivity on an island in the Ogooué River, near Ndjolé on June 2, 1900, following a bout of pneumonia. His tomb is at the Camayanne Mausoleum, within the gardens of Conakry Grand Mosque.

Legacy
He is considered a powerful example of resistance to French colonial forces and known for his building collaboration among diverse groups, as well as his war strategies.
His great-grandson, Ahmed Sékou Touré, was elected as the first President of Guinea after it became independent.

In popular culture
Massa Makan Diabaté's play Une hyène à jeun (A Hyena with an Empty Stomach, 1988) dramatizes Samori Ture's signing of the 1886 Treaty of Kéniéba-Koura, which granted the left bank of the Niger to France.
Guinean band Bembeya Jazz National commemorated Ture in their 1969 release Regard sur le passé. The album draws upon Manding Djeli traditions and consists of two recordings that recount Ture's anti-colonial resistance and nation-building.
Author Ta-Nehisi Coates references Ture in his book Between the World and Me when explaining to his son where his name Samori came from.
Ivorien reggae superstar Alpha Blondy eulogises Ture in his hit song "Bory Samory" from the Album Cocody Rock.

Footnotes

References

Asante, Molefi Kete, The History of Africa: The Quest for Eternal Harmony (New York: Routledge, 2007).
Boahen, A. Adu, ed. UNESCO General History of Africa, Vol. VII: Africa Under Colonial Domination, 1880–1935 (Berkeley: University of California Press, 1985).
Gann, L. H., and Peter Duigan, eds. Colonialism in Africa, 1870–1960, Vol. 1: The History and Politics of Colonialism 1870–1914 (Cambridge, UK: Cambridge University Press, 1969).
Oliver, Roland, and G. N. Sanderson, eds. The Cambridge History of Africa, Vol. 6: from 1870–1905 (Cambridge, UK: Cambridge University Press, 1985).

Sources

 A fourth volume of maps published in Paris in 1990. Monumental work of history perhaps unique in African literature.
  Piłaszewicz, Stanisław. 1991. On the Veracity of Oral Tradition as a Historical Source: – the Case of Samori Ture. In Unwritten Testimonies of the African Past. Proceedings of the International Symposium held in Ojrzanów n. Warsaw on 07-08 November 1989 ed. by S. Piłaszewicz and E. Rzewuski, (Orientalia Varsoviensia 2). Warsaw: Wydawnictwa Uniwersytetu Warszawskiego.

External links

Samori biography
West Africa; the fight for survival
New York Times article about his capture

1830s births
1900 deaths
History of Mali
History of Guinea
History of Ivory Coast
People of French West Africa
Military history of Africa
Converts to Islam
19th-century monarchs in Africa
Prisoners who died in French detention
Guinean Muslims
Guinean prisoners and detainees
Guinean religious leaders
Deaths from pneumonia in Gabon